Marcel Christophe (born 19 August 1974) is a retired Luxembourgian football striker.

References

1974 births
Living people
Luxembourgian footballers
FC Mondercange players
FC Differdange 03 players
Association football forwards
Luxembourg under-21 international footballers
Luxembourg international footballers